Musewali , is a town of Mianwali District in the Punjab province of Pakistan. It is located in Piplan Tehsil  at 32°15'0N 71°20'0E

References

Union councils of Mianwali District
Populated places in Mianwali District